Rendezvous in Corfu (alternative names  Date in Corfu or ) is a 1960 Greek black and white drama film directed and written by  and starring Jenny Karezi, Alekos Alexandrakis and Vangelis Ploios.  It was produced by Olympia Film.

Plot 
A young womanising lawyer (Alekos Alexandrakis) used at "throwing away women like a book fast read" finds a match in the person of the dynamic manager (Jenny Karezi) who works at his mother's hotel in the Greek island of Corfu.

Cast 
 Alekos Alexandrakis : Andreas Labrinos
 Jenny Karezi :Diana/Mirka
 Lykourgos Kallergis : Mr. Lianitis
  : Eleni Lambrinou
 Vangelis Ploios : Tonis
 Kaiti Passa : Janet Giannatou

The soundtrack by Manos Hadjidakis, with songs sung by Nana Mouskouri, was released as Rendezvous at Corfu.

External links

Notes and references 

1960 films
1960s Greek-language films
1960 drama films
Films shot in Corfu
Films set in Corfu
Films set in Greece
Greek drama films